Seymeria is a genus of flowering plants belonging to the family Orobanchaceae.

Its native range is from southern USA (in the states of Alabama, Arizona, Arkansas, Florida, Georgia, Louisiana, Mississippi, North Carolina, South Carolina, Tennessee, Texas and Virginia) to Mexico and the Bahamas. 

The genus name of Seymeria is in honour of Henry Seymer (1745–1800), an English amateur botanist. It was first described and published in Fl. Amer. (Sept. 2) on page 736 in 1813.

Known species
According to Kew:

Seymeria anita 
Seymeria bipinnatisecta 
Seymeria cassioides 
Seymeria coahuilana 
Seymeria cualana 
Seymeria decurva 
Seymeria deflexa 
Seymeria falcata 
Seymeria gypsophila 
Seymeria integrifolia 
Seymeria laciniata 
Seymeria mazatecana 
Seymeria pailana 
Seymeria pectinata 
Seymeria pennellii 
Seymeria scabra 
Seymeria sinaloana 
Seymeria tamaulipana 
Seymeria virgata

References

Orobanchaceae
Orobanchaceae genera
Plants described in 1813
Flora of Guyana
Flora of the Southeastern United States
Flora of Arizona
Flora of Texas
Flora of Mexico
Flora of the Bahamas